Ghahremani is a surname. Notable people with the surname include:

Asghar Ghahremani (born 1972), Iranian futsal player
Gary Ghahremani, Iranian-born American radiologist
Mohsen Ghahremani (born 1974) Iranian football referee
Sarou Ghahremani (1993–2018), Iranian Kurdish political prisoner
Siamak Ghahremani (born 1974), Iranian-born American radio host
Vida Ghahremani (1936–2018), Iranian film actress

See also
Ghahreman

Persian-language surnames